The  Seattle Mariners 2006 season was their 30th since the franchise creation, and their third consecutive season finishing at the bottom of the American League West, finishing with a  record.

Two players were featured in the All-Star Game: Ichiro Suzuki, making his sixth appearance in the All-Star Game, and José López, with his first appearance.

Offseason
December 7, 2005: Yorvit Torrealba was traded by the Seattle Mariners to the Colorado Rockies for Marcos Carvajal.
January 9, 2006: Cody Ransom was signed as a free agent with the Seattle Mariners.
March 30, 2006: Cody Ransom was purchased by the Houston Astros from the Seattle Mariners.

Regular season

Season standings

Record vs. opponents

Notable transactions
July 26, 2006: Ben Broussard was traded by the Cleveland Indians with cash to the Seattle Mariners for a player to be named later and Shin-Soo Choo. The Seattle Mariners sent Shawn Nottingham (minors) (August 24, 2006) to the Cleveland Indians to complete the trade.

Roster

Game log 

|- style="background-color:#ffbbbb"
| 1 || April 3 || Angels || 5–4 || Shields (1–0) || Sherrill (0–1) || Rodríguez (1) || 45,515 || 0–1
|- style="background-color:#bbffbb"
| 2 || April 4 || Angels || 10–8 || Piñeiro (1–0) || Lackey (0–1) || || 20,051 || 1–1
|- style="background-color:#bbffbb"
| 3 || April 5 || Angels || 6–4 || Washburn (1–0) || Weaver (0–1) || Sherrill (1) || 21,394 || 2–1
|- style="background-color:#bbffbb"
| 4 || April 6 || Athletics || 6–2 || Meche (1–0) || Loaiza (0–1) || Putz (1) || 22,701 || 3–1
|- style="background-color:#ffbbbb"
| 5 || April 7 || Athletics || 5–0 || Blanton (1–0) || Hernández (0–1) || || 30,612 || 3–2
|- style="background-color:#ffbbbb"
| 6 || April 8 || Athletics || 3–0 || Zito (1–1) || Moyer (0–1) || Street (1) || 37,904 || 3–3
|- style="background-color:#ffbbbb"
| 7 || April 9 || Athletics || 6–4 || Harden (1–0) || Piñeiro (1–1) || Street (2) || 27,139 || 3–4
|- style="background-color:#ffbbbb"
| 8 || April 11 || @ Indians || 9–5 || Lee (1–0) || Washburn (1–1) || || 17,559 || 3–5
|- style="background-color:#bbffbb"
| 9 || April 12 || @ Indians || 11–9 || Woods (1–0) || Byrd (1–1) || Guardado (1) || 14,773 || 4–5
|- style="background-color:#bbffbb"
|10 || April 13 || @ Indians || 9–5 || Mateo (1–0) || Sauerbeck (0–1) || Putz (2) || 24,638 || 5–5
|- style="background-color:#ffbbbb"
| 11 || April 14 || @ Red Sox || 2–1 || Schilling (3–0) || Moyer (0–2) || Papelbon (5) || 36,431 || 5–6
|- style="background-color:#bbffbb"
| 12 || April 15 || @ Red Sox || 3–0 || Piñeiro (2–1) || Wakefield (1–2) || Guardado (2) || 36,047 || 6–6
|- style="background-color:#ffbbbb"
| 13 || April 16 || @ Red Sox || 3–2 || Beckett (3–0) || Washburn (1–2) || Papelbon (6) || 36,181 || 6–7
|- style="background-color:#ffbbbb"
| 14 || April 17 || @ Red Sox || 7–6 || Timlin (1–0) || Guardado (0–1) || || 36,188 || 6–8
|- style="background-color:#ffbbbb"
| 15 || April 18 || Rangers || 7–4 || Koronka (2–1) || Hernández (0–2) || Cordero (2) || 17,927 || 6–9
|- style="background-color:#bbffbb"
| 16 || April 19 || Rangers || 9–6 || Putz (1–0) || Cordero (1–2) || || 17,613 || 7–9
|- style="background-color:#ffbbbb"
| 17 || April 20 || Rangers || 4–3 || Bauer (1–0) || Guardado (0–2) || Cordero (3) || 17,917 || 7–10
|- style="background-color:#ffbbbb"
| 18 || April 21 || Tigers || 2–1 || Maroth (3–0) || Washburn (1–3) || Jones (1) || 35,237 || 7–11
|- style="background-color:#ffbbbb"
| 19 || April 22 || Tigers || 2–0 || Robertson (2–2) || Meche (1–1) || Rodney (4) || 27,893 || 7–12
|- style="background-color:#ffbbbb"
| 20 || April 23 || Tigers || 6–4 || Verlander (2–2) || Hernández (0–3) || Jones (2) || 28,659 || 7–13
|- style="background-color:#bbffbb"
| 21 || April 24 || White Sox || 4–3 || Mateo (2–0) || McCarthy (1–1) || || 20,390 || 8–13
|- style="background-color:#ffbbbb"
| 22 || April 25 || White Sox || 13–3 || Vázquez (2–1) || Piñeiro (2–2) || Logan (1) || 20,451 || 8–14
|- style="background-color:#bbffbb"
| 23 || April 26 || White Sox || 5–1 || Washburn (2–3) || Buehrle (3–1) || || 23,848 || 9–14
|- style="background-color:#ffbbbb"
| 24 || April 28 || @ Orioles || 5–2 || Cabrera (2–2)|| Meche (1–2) || Ray (7) || 26,934 || 9–15
|- style="background-color:#bbffbb"
| 25 || April 29 || @ Orioles || 8–6 || Hernández (1–3) || Brower (0–1)|| Guardado (3) || 34,161 || 10–15
|- style="background-color:#bbffbb"
| 26 || April 30 || @ Orioles || 4–3 || Moyer (1–2) || López (1–3) || Guardado (4) || 32,421 || 11–15

|- style="background-color:#bbffbb"
| 27 || May 1 || @ Twins || 8–2 || Piñeiro (3–2) || Baker (1–3) || || 11,796 || 12–15
|- style="background-color:#ffbbbb"
| 28 || May 2 || @ Twins || 5–1 || Santana (2–3) || Washburn (2–4) || || 14,513 || 12–16
|- style="background-color:#ffbbbb"
| 29 || May 3 || @ White Sox || 6–5 || Jenks (1–0) || Woods (1–1) || || 27,569 || 12–17
|- style="background-color:#ffbbbb"
| 30 || May 4 || @ White Sox || 4–1 || Contreras (5–0) || Hernández (1–4) || Jenks (9) || 26,313 || 12–18
|- style="background-color:#ffbbbb"
| 31 || May 5 || Indians || 9–4 || Westbrook (3–2) || Soriano (0–1) || || 32,998 || 12–19
|- style="background-color:#bbffbb"
| 32 || May 6 || Indians || 4–1 || Piñeiro (4–2) || Lee (2–3) || Putz (3) || 28,672 || 13–19
|- style="background-color:#ffbbbb"
| 33 || May 7 || Indians || 2–0 || Sabathia (2–0) || Washburn (2–5) || Wickman (6) || 35,562 || 13–20
|- style="background-color:#bbffbb"
| 34 || May 8 || Devil Rays || 6–3 || Meche (2–2) || Orvella (1–4) || Putz (4) || 16,102 || 14–20
|- style="background-color:#bbffbb"
| 35 || May 9 || Devil Rays || 8–1 || Hernández (2–4) || Waechter (0–2) || Soriano (1) || 19,726 || 15–20
|- style="background-color:#ffbbbb"
| 36 || May 10 || Devil Rays || 1–0 || Kazmir (5–2) || Moyer (1–3) || Walker (4) || 21,801 || 15–21
|- style="background-color:#ffbbbb"
| 37 || May 12 || @ Angels || 12–7 || Escobar (5–2) || Piñeiro (4–3) || Carrasco (1) || 43,912 || 15–22
|- style="background-color:#bbffbb"
| 38 || May 13 || @ Angels || 5–4 || Sherrill (1–1) || Gregg (2–2) || Woods (1) || 43,821 || 16–22
|- style="background-color:#bbffbb"
| 39 || May 14 || @ Angels || 9–4 || Meche (3–2) || Weaver (1–6) || Fruto (1) || 43,191 || 17–22
|- style="background-color:#ffbbbb"
| 40 || May 16 || @ Athletics || 12–6 || Blanton (4–4) || Hernández (2–5) ||  || 16,397 || 17–23
|- style="background-color:#ffbbbb"
| 41 || May 17 || @ Athletics || 7–2 || Zito (3–3) || Moyer (1–4) ||  || 19,208 || 17–24
|- style="background-color:#ffbbbb"
| 42 || May 18 || @ Athletics || 6–3 || Saarloos (2–1) || Piñeiro (4–4) || Street (6) || 16,397 || 17–25
|- style="background-color:#bbffbb"
| 43 || May 19 || Padres || 7–4 || Soriano (1–1) || Cassidy (3–2) ||  || 35,338 || 18–25
|- style="background-color:#bbffbb"
| 44 || May 20 || Padres || 6–3 || Meche (4–2) || Hensley (2–3) || Putz (5) || 33,946 || 19–25
|- style="background-color:#bbffbb"
| 45 || May 21 || Padres || 10–8 || Hernández (3–5) || Park (2–2) || Putz (6) || 37,132 || 20–25
|- style="background-color:#bbffbb"
| 46 || May 22 || Orioles || 8–6 || Moyer (2–4) || Bédard (5–3) || Guardado (5) || 18,819 || 21–25
|- style="background-color:#ffbbbb"
| 47 || May 23 || Orioles || 14–4 || Halama (3–1) || Piñeiro (4–5) || Ray (11) || 19,435 || 21–26
|- style="background-color:#bbffbb"
| 48 || May 24 || Orioles || 7–4 || Washburn (3–5) || Benson (6–4) || Putz (7) || 21,991 || 22–26
|- style="background-color:#ffbbbb"
| 49 || May 25 || Orioles || 2–0 || López (2–7) || Meche (4–3) || Ray (12) || 23,806 || 22–27
|- style="background-color:#ffbbbb"
| 50 || May 26 || @ Twins || 3–1 || Liriano (3–0) || Hernández (3–6) || Nathan (6) || 28,082 || 22–28
|- style="background-color:#ffbbbb"
| 51 || May 27 || @ Twins || 9–5 || Bonser (1–0) || Moyer (2–5) || Rincón (1) || 25,305 || 22–29
|- style="background-color:#ffbbbb"
| 52 || May 28 || @ Twins || 4–3 || Nathan (3–0) || Guardado (0–3) ||  || 24,388 || 22–30
|- style="background-color:#ffbbbb"
| 53 || May 29 || @ Rangers || 2–0 || Rheinecker (1–0) || Washburn (3–6) || Bauer (1) || 23,771 || 22–31
|- style="background-color:#ffbbbb"
| 54 || May 30 || @ Rangers || 6–4 || Millwood (6–3) || Meche (4–4) || Otsuka (9) || 18,084 || 22–32
|- style="background-color:#bbffbb"
| 55 || May 31 || @ Rangers || 14–5 || Hernández (4–6) || Koronka (4–3) ||  || 19,131 || 23–32

|- style="background-color:#bbffbb"
| 56 || June 2 || Royals || 4–0 || Moyer (3–5) || Keppel (0–1) ||  || 28,382 || 24–32
|- style="background-color:#bbffbb"
| 57 || June 3 || Royals || 12–1 || Piñeiro (5–5) || Etherton (1–1) ||  || 29,659 || 25–32
|- style="background-color:#ffbbbb"
| 58 || June 4 || Royals || 9–4 || Redman (1–4) || Washburn (3–7) || Dessens (1) || 28,886 || 25–33
|- style="background-color:#bbffbb"
| 59 || June 5 || Royals || 4–1 || Meche (5–4) || Wood (3–1) || Putz (8) || 18,409 || 26–33
|- style="background-color:#bbffbb"
| 60 || June 6 || Twins || 4–2 || Hernández (5–6) || Liriano (4–1) || Putz (9) || 21,028 || 27–33
|- style="background-color:#bbffbb"
| 61 || June 7 || Twins || 10–9 || Mateo (3–0) || Crain (0–4) ||  || 24,785 || 28–33
|- style="background-color:#ffbbbb"
| 62 || June 8 || Twins || 7–3 || Santana (6–4) || Piñeiro (5–6) ||  || 27,341 || 28–34
|- style="background-color:#bbffbb"
| 63 || June 9 || @ Angels || 4–1 || Washburn (4–7) || Escobar (5–7) || Putz (10) || 44,114 || 29–34
|- style="background-color:#bbffbb"
| 64 || June 10 || @ Angels || 12–6 || Meche (6–4) || Lackey (4–4) ||  ||  44,129 || 30–34
|- style="background-color:#bbffbb"
| 65 || June 11 || @ Angels || 6–2 || Hernández (6–6) || Weaver (3–9) ||  || 42,198 || 31–34
|- style="background-color:#ffbbbb"
| 66 || June 13 || @ Athletics || 2–0 || Blanton (6–6) || Moyer (3–6) || Street (15) || 15,216 || 31–35
|- style="background-color:#ffbbbb"
| 67 || June 14 || @ Athletics || 7–2 || Haren (6–5) || Piñeiro (5–7) ||  || 20,550 || 31–36
|- style="background-color:#ffbbbb"
| 68 || June 15 || @ Athletics || 9–6 || Loaiza (2–3) || Washburn (4–8) || Street (16) || 16,563 || 31–37
|- style="background-color:#bbffbb"
| 69 || June 16 || Giants || 5–4 || Hernández (7–6) || Lowry (2–5) || Putz (11) || 41,133 || 32–37
|- style="background-color:#bbffbb"
| 70 || June 17 || Giants || 8–1 || Meche (7–4) || Schmidt (6–3) ||  || 45,229 || 33–37
|- style="background-color:#bbffbb"
| 71 || June 18 || Giants || 5–1 || Moyer (4–6) || Wright (5–7) ||  || 45,216 || 34–37
|- style="background-color:#bbffbb"
| 72 || June 20 || @ Dodgers || 9–4 || Piñeiro (6–7) || Penny (7–2) || Soriano (2) || 43,949 || 35–37
|- style="background-color:#bbffbb"
| 73 || June 21 || @ Dodgers || 8–5 || Mateo (4–0) || Báez (4–4) || Putz (12) || 40,419 || 36–37
|- style="background-color:#ffbbbb"
| 74 || June 22 || @ Dodgers || 4–2 || Lowe (6–3) || Hernández (7–7) ||  || 46,207 || 36–38
|- style="background-color:#ffbbbb"
| 75 || June 23 || @ Padres || 2–1 || Linebrink (5–2) || Mateo (4–1) ||  || 40,049 || 36–39
|- style="background-color:#bbffbb"
| 75 || June 24 || @ Padres || 9–5 || Moyer (5–6) || Park (5–4) ||  || 33,349 || 37–39
|- style="background-color:#bbffbb"
| 77 || June 25 || @ Padres || 9–4 || Sherrill (2–1) || Embree (2–1) ||  || 32,707 || 38–39
|- style="background-color:#bbffbb"
| 78 || June 27 || @ D-backs || 11–7 || Woods (2–1) || Lyon (1–2) || Putz (13) || 25,068 || 39–39
|- style="background-color:#bbffbb"
| 79 || June 28 || @ D-backs || 11–3 || Hernández (8–7) || González (0–2) ||  || 19,723 || 40–39
|- style="background-color:#bbffbb"
| 80 || June 29 || @ D-backs || 3–2 || Guardado (1–3) || Julio (1–3) || Putz (14) || 20,649 || 41–39
|- style="background-color:#ffbbbb"
| 81 || June 30 || Rockies || 2–0 || Fogg (6–5) || Moyer (5–7) ||  || 31,612 || 41–40

|- style="background-color:#bbffbb"
| 82 || July 1 || Rockies || 8–7 || Mateo (5–1) || Cortés (3–1) || Putz (15) || 33,638 || 42–40
|- style="background-color:#ffbbbb"
| 83 || July 2 || Rockies || 4–3 || Fuentes (2–1) || Mateo (5–2) || King (1) || 31,709 || 42–41
|- style="background-color:#ffbbbb"
| 84 || July 3 || Angels || 7–1 || Weaver (5–0) || Hernández (8–8) ||  || 30,632 || 42–42
|- style="background-color:#ffbbbb"
| 85 || July 4 || Angels || 14–6 || Santana (9–3) || Mateo (5–3) ||  || 30,853 || 42–43
|- style="background-color:#ffbbbb"
| 86 || July 5 || Angels || 4–0 || Colón (1–4) || Moyer (5–8) ||  || 25,009 || 42–44
|- style="background-color:#ffbbbb"
| 87 || July 7 || Tigers || 6–1 || Bonderman (8–4) || Piñeiro (6–8) ||  || 31,727 || 42–45
|- style="background-color:#ffbbbb"
| 88 || July 8 || Tigers || 2–1 || Miner (6–1) || Washburn (4–9) || Jones (23) || 32,404 || 42–46
|- style="background-color:#bbffbb"
| 89 || July 9 || Tigers || 3–2 || Meche (8–4) || Robertson (8–5) || Putz (16) || 37,364 || 43–46
|- style="background-color:#bbffbb"
| 90 || July 14 || @ Blue Jays || 5–3 || Meche (9–4) || Janssen (6–8) || Putz (17) || 23,443 || 44–46
|- style="background-color:#ffbbbb"
| 91 || July 15 || @ Blue Jays || 7–6 || Downs (3–0) || Fruto (0–1) ||  || 36,069 || 44–47
|- style="background-color:#ffbbbb"
| 92 || July 16 || @ Blue Jays || 4–3 || Downs (4–0) || Sherrill (2–2) ||  || 28,679 || 44–48
|- style="background-color:#ffbbbb"
| 93 || July 17 || @ Yankees || 4–2 || Wang (10–4) || Washburn (4–10) || Rivera (22) || 53,444 || 44–49
|- style="background-color:#ffbbbb"
| 94 || July 18 || @ Yankees || 5–4 || Proctor (3–2) || Mateo (5–4) ||  || 52,992 || 44–50
|- style="background-color:#bbffbb"
| 95 || July 19 || @ Yankees || 3–2 || Lowe (1–0) || Johnson (10–8) || Putz (18) || 54,121 || 45–50
|- style="background-color:#ffbbbb"
| 96 || July 21 || Red Sox || 9–4 || Snyder (2–1) || Moyer (5–9) ||  || 46,325 || 45–51
|- style="background-color:#bbffbb"
| 97 || July 22 || Red Sox || 5–2 || Hernández (9–8) || Gabbard (0–1) || Putz (19) || 46,118 || 46–51
|- style="background-color:#bbffbb"
| 98 || July 23 || Red Sox || 9–8 || Putz (2–0) || Timlin (5–1) ||  || 45,975 || 47–51
|- style="background-color:#bbffbb"
| 99 || July 24 || Blue Jays || 7–3 || Piñeiro (7–8) || Janssen (6–10) ||  || 29,787 || 48–51
|- style="background-color:#ffbbbb"
| 100 || July 25 || Blue Jays || 12–3 || Halladay (13–2) || Meche (9–5) ||  || 30,793 || 48–52
|- style="background-color:#bbffbb"
| 101 || July 26 || Blue Jays || 7–4 || Moyer (6–9) || Burnett (2–4) || Putz (20) || 33,629 || 49–52
|- style="background-color:#ffbbbb"
| 102 || July 28 || @ Indians || 1–0 || Sowers (3–3) || Hernández (9–9) ||  || 25,045 || 49–53
|- style="background-color:#bbffbb"
| 103 || July 29 || @ Indians || 3–1 || Washburn (5–10) || Westbrook (7–7) || Putz (21) || 27,876 || 50–53
|- style="background-color:#bbffbb"
| 104 || July 30 || @ Indians || 7–3 || Woods (3–1) || Carmona (1–4) || Putz (22) || 23,146 || 51–53
|- style="background-color:#bbffbb"
| 105 || July 31 || @ Orioles || 10–5 || Mateo (6–4) || Loewen (1–3) ||  || 16,620 || 52–53

|- style="background-color:#ffbbbb"
| 106 || August 1 || @ Orioles || 2–0 || López (8–11) || Moyer (6–10) || Ray (27) || 20,226 || 52–54
|- style="background-color:#bbffbb"
| 107 || August 2 || @ Orioles || 2–1 || Hernández (10–9) || Bédard (12–7) || Putz (23) || 17,682 || 53–54
|- style="background-color:#ffbbbb"
| 108 || August 4 || Athletics || 5–2 || Zito (12–7) || Washburn (5–11) ||  || 44,277 || 53–55
|- style="background-color:#ffbbbb"
| 109 || August 5 || Athletics || 5–2 || Haren (9–9) || Piñeiro (7–9) || Street (24) || 40,115 || 53–56
|- style="background-color:#ffbbbb"
| 110 || August 6 || Athletics || 7–6 || Blanton (12–9) || Meche (9–6) || Street (25) || 37,437 || 53–57
|- style="background-color:#bbffbb"
| 111 || August 7 || Devil Rays || 5–4 || Mateo (7–4) || Corcoran (4–3) || Putz (24) || 30,735 || 54–57
|- style="background-color:#bbffbb"
| 112 || August 8 || Devil Rays || 5–1 || Mateo (8–4) || Camp (4–1) ||  || 32,951 || 55–57
|- style="background-color:#bbffbb"
| 113 || August 9 || Devil Rays || 2–0 || Washburn (6–11) || Shields (4–6) || Putz (25) || 39,856 || 56–57
|- style="background-color:#ffbbbb"
| 114 || August 10 || @ Rangers || 8–2 || Eaton (2–2) || Piñeiro (7–10) ||  || 31,763 || 56–58
|- style="background-color:#ffbbbb"
| 115 || August 11 || @ Rangers || 14–7 || Littleton (2–0) || Meche (9–7) ||  || 28,207 || 56–59
|- style="background-color:#ffbbbb"
| 116 || August 12 || @ Rangers || 5–4 || Vólquez (1–1) || Moyer (6–11) || Ostuka (23) || 35,784 || 56–60
|- style="background-color:#ffbbbb"
| 117 || August 13 || @ Rangers || 10–6 || Millwood (11–8) || Hernández (10–10) ||  || 29,717 || 56–61
|- style="background-color:#ffbbbb"
| 118 || August 14 || @ Athletics || 5–4 || Kennedy (3–0) || Soriano (1–2) || Duchscherer (3) || 21,859 || 56–62
|- style="background-color:#ffbbbb"
| 119 || August 15 || @ Athletics || 11–2 || Saarloos (5–6) || Piñeiro (7–11) ||  || 23,726 || 56–63
|- style="background-color:#ffbbbb"
| 120 || August 16 || @ Athletics || 4–0 || Haren (11–9) || Meche (9–8) ||  || 34,077 || 56–64
|- style="background-color:#ffbbbb"
| 121 || August 17 || @ Angels || 5–2 || Escobar (9–10) || Moyer (6–12) || Rodríguez (32) || 43,813 || 56–65
|- style="background-color:#ffbbbb"
| 122 || August 18 || @ Angels || 3–0 || Weaver (9–0) || Hernández (10–11) || Rodríguez (33) || 44,072 || 56–66
|- style="background-color:#ffbbbb"
| 123 || August 19 || @ Angels || 9–7 || Carrasco (4–3) || Washburn (6–12) || Rodríguez (34) || 44,106 || 56–67
|- style="background-color:#ffbbbb"
| 124 || August 20 || @ Angels || 3–2 || Donnelly (3–0) || Putz (2–1) ||  || 43,876 || 56–68
|- style="background-color:#bbffbb"
| 125 || August 22 || Yankees || 6–5 || Mateo (9–4) || Villone (3–2) ||  || 42,454 || 57–68
|- style="background-color:#ffbbbb"
| 126 || August 23 || Yankees || 9–2 || Wang (15–5) || Hernández (10–12) ||  || 41,380 || 57–59
|- style="background-color:#bbffbb"
| 127 || August 24 || Yankees || 4–2 || Washburn (7–12) || Johnson (14–10) || Putz (26) || 44,634 || 58–69
|- style="background-color:#bbffbb"
| 128 || August 25 || Red Sox || 6–0 || Woods (4–1) || Schilling (14–6) ||  || 40,817 || 59–69
|- style="background-color:#bbffbb"
| 129 || August 26 || Red Sox || 4–3 || Putz (3–1) || Timlin (5–4) ||  || 44,779 || 60–69
|- style="background-color:#bbffbb"
| 130 || August 27 || Red Sox || 6–3 || Baek (1–0) || Snyder (3–3) || Putz (27) || 44,288 || 61–69
|- style="background-color:#bbffbb"
| 131 || August 28 || Angels || 2–0 || Hernández (11–12) || Escobar (9–12) ||  || 28,748 || 62–69
|- style="background-color:#bbffbb"
| 132 || August 29 || Angels || 6–4 || Washburn (8–12) || Weaver (9–2) || J. J. Putz (28) || 29,059 || 63–69
|- style="background-color:#ffbbbb"
| 133 || August 30 || Angels || 5–3 || Lackey (11–9) || Woods (4–2) || Rodríguez (37) || 31,269 || 63–70

|- style="background-color:#ffbbbb"
| 134 || September 1 || @ Devil Rays || 2–1 || McClung (5–12) || Sherrill (2–3) ||  || 11,196 || 63–71
|- style="background-color:#bbffbb"
|135  || September 2 || @ Devil Rays || 4–3 || Baek (2–0) || Howell (0–2) || Putz (29) || 14,503 || 64–71
|- style="background-color:#ffbbbb"
| 136 || September 3 || @ Devil Rays || 7–6 || Meadows (3–5) || Hernández (11–12) || McClung (4) || 14,501 || 64–72
|- style="background-color:#ffbbbb"
| 137 || September 4 || @ Tigers || 6–2 || Robertson (12–11) || Washburn (8–13) ||  || 32,948 || 64–73
|- style="background-color:#bbffbb"
| 138 || September 5 || @ Tigers || 4–3 || Piñeiro (8–11) || Miller (0–1) || Putz (30) || 23,583 || 65–73
|- style="background-color:#bbffbb"
| 139 || September 6 || @ Tigers || 5–4 || Huber (1–0) || Zumaya (6–3) || Putz (31) || 23,066 || 66–73
|- style="background-color:#bbffbb"
| 140 || September 8 || Rangers || 7–2 || Baek (3–0) || Millwood (14–10) || Piñeiro (1) || 28,646 || 67–73
|- style="background-color:#bbffbb"
| 141 || September 9 || Rangers || 3–2 || Fruto (1–1) || Rheinecker (4–6) ||  || 33,454 || 68–73
|- style="background-color:#ffbbbb"
| 142 || September 10 || Rangers || 4–2 || Wilson (2–2) || Huber (1–1) || Otsuka (32) || 34,321 || 68–74
|- style="background-color:#ffbbbb"
| 143 || September 11 || Blue Jays || 6–2 || Lilly (13–12) || Woods (4–3) ||  || 24,462 || 68–75
|- style="background-color:#bbffbb"
| 144 || September 12 || Blue Jays || 4–2 || Meche (10–8) || Marcum (2–4) || Putz (32) || 26,144 || 69–75
|- style="background-color:#ffbbbb"
| 145 || September 13 || Blue Jays || 10–0 || Burnett (8–7) || Baek (3–1) ||  || 26,225 || 69–76
|- style="background-color:#ffbbbb"
| 146 || September 14 || @ Royals || 10–8 || Pérez (2–3) || Washburn (8–14) ||  || 8,839 || 69–77
|- style="background-color:#bbffbb"
| 147 || September 15 || @ Royals || 11–8 || Woods (5–3) || Braun (0–1) ||  || 16,412 || 70–77
|- style="background-color:#ffbbbb"
| 148 || September 16 || @ Royals || 7–4 || Redman (10–9) || Piñeiro (8–12) || Nelson (8) || 12,116 || 70–78
|- style="background-color:#bbffbb"
| 149 || September 17 || @ Royals || 10–5 || Meche (11–8) || Gobble (3–6) ||  || 9,817 || 71–78
|- style="background-color:#ffbbbb"
| 150 || September 18 || @ Rangers || 8–1 || Millwod (16–10) || Hernández (11–14) ||  || 18,214 || 71–79
|- style="background-color:#bbffbb"
| 151 || September 19 || @ Rangers || 9–7 || Huber (2–1) || Wilson (2–1) || Putz (33) || 18,551 || 72–79
|- style="background-color:#bbffbb"
| 152 || September 20 || @ Rangers || 6–3 || Baek (4–1) || Tejeda (4–4) || Putz (34) || 26,006 || 73–79
|- style="background-color:#bbffbb"
| 153 || September 21 || @ White Sox || 9–0 || Woods (6–3) || Vázquez (11–10) ||  || 33,976 || 74–79
|- style="background-color:#bbffbb"
| 154 || September 22 || @ White Sox || 11–6 || Fruto (2–1) || Contreras (13–9) ||  || 37,557 || 75–79
|- style="background-color:#ffbbbb"
| 155 || September 23 || @ White Sox || 11–7 || Haeger (1–1) || Piñeiro (8–13) ||  || 37,400 || 75–80
|- style="background-color:#ffbbbb"
| 156 || September 24 || @ White Sox || 12–7 || García (16–9) || Feierabend (0–1) ||  || 37,518 || 75–81
|- style="background-color:#bbffbb"
| 157 || September 25 || Athletics || 10–9 || Putz (4–1) || Calero (3–2) ||  || 20,982 || 76–81
|- style="background-color:#ffbbbb"
| 158 || September 26 || Athletics || 12–3 || Harden (4–0) || Jake Woods (6–4) ||  || 19,604 || 76–82
|- style="background-color:#ffbbbb"
| 159 || September 27 || Athletics || 7–6 || Witasick (4–0) || Sherrill (2–4) || Street (37) || 23,421 || 76–83
|- style="background-color:#ffbbbb"
| 160 || September 29 || Rangers || 6–5 || Padilla (15–10) || Fruto (2–2) || Wilson (2–2) || 30,766 || 76–84
|- style="background-color:#bbffbb"
| 161 || September 30 || Rangers || 3–1 || Hernández (12–14) || Millwood (16–12) || Putz (35) || 23,310 || 77–84

|- style="background-color:#bbffbb"
| 162 || October 1 || Rangers || 3–2 || Woods (7–4) || Tejeda (5–5) || Putz (36) || 28,361 || 78–84

Player stats

Batting

Starters by position
Note: Pos = Position; G = Games played; AB = At bats; H = Hits; Avg. = Batting average; HR = Home runs; RBI = Runs batted in

Other batters
Note: G = Games played; AB = At bats; H = Hits; Avg. = Batting average; HR = Home runs; RBI = Runs batted in

Pitching

Starting pitchers 
Note: G = Games pitched; IP = Innings pitched; W = Wins; L = Losses; ERA = Earned run average; SO = Strikeouts

Other pitchers
Note: G = Games pitched; IP = Innings pitched; W = Wins; L = Losses; ERA = Earned run average; SO = Strikeouts

Relief pitchers 
Note: G = Games pitched; IP = Innings pitched; W = Wins; L = Losses; H = Holds; SV = Saves; ERA = Earned run average; SO = Strikeouts

Team statistics
Positions in brackets are in league with other MLB teams

Batting
Note: G = Games played; AB = At bats; H = Hits; R = Runs; Avg. = Batting average; HR = Home runs; RBI = Runs batted in

Pitching
Note: G = Games pitched; IP = Innings pitched; W = Wins; L = Losses; ERA = Earned run average; SO = Strikeouts; SHO = Shutouts

Farm system

LEAGUE CHAMPIONS: Inland Empire

Major League Baseball Draft 

Below is a complete list of Seattle Mariners draft picks from the June 2006 draft.

The 2006 Major League Baseball Draft was held from June 6 to 7. The Mariners selected a total of 50 players in the draft. Of those 50 players, the Mariners signed 26 players. They did however sign multiple players after the draft deadline.

June amateur draft

Key

Table

References

Game Logs:
1st Half: Seattle Mariners Game Log on ESPN.com
2nd Half: Seattle Mariners Game Log on ESPN.com
Batting Statistics: Seattle Mariners Batting Stats on ESPN.com
Pitching Statistics: Seattle Mariners Pitching Stats on ESPN.com

External links
2006 Seattle Mariners team page at Baseball Reference
2006 Seattle Mariners team page at www.baseball-almanac.com

Seattle Mariners seasons
Seattle Mariners
2006 in sports in Washington (state)